Hansan (also Romanized as Ḩansān) is a village in Iran. It is located in the Irafshan Rural District, Ashar District, Mehrestan County, Sistan and Baluchestan Province. As of the 2006 census, its population was 24.

References 

Populated places in Mehrestan County